The 2011–12 season was the 132nd season of competitive football by Rangers.

Overview

Rangers played a total of 45 competitive matches during the 2011–12 season. Smith's deputy and Rangers record goalscorer Ally McCoist was appointed manager of the club. However, McCoist was hampered by a bizarre transfer policy the club utilised under Whyte's control. This resulted in protracted transfer negotiations with several targets but without significant recruitment and this probably contributed to Rangers being knocked out of both the UEFA Champions League and the UEFA Europa League by the end of August, depriving the club of income that may have been anticipated. With the new ownership there initially appeared to be some financial stability of the club. A number of first-team regulars were secured on long-term contract extensions including Steven Davis, Allan McGregor, Steven Whittaker and Gregg Wylde. When McCoist entered the transfer market, his first signing being Almería midfielder Juan Manuel Ortiz, he soon encountered difficulties. A number of highly publicised failed transfers, including deals for Wesley Verhoek and Roland Juhász, led to many doubting Whyte's financial prowess.

Rangers's first Scottish Premier League match of the season was a home match against Jim Jefferies' Heart of Midlothian, where the league flag was unfurled by then chairman Craig Whyte, as Rangers were under considerable pressure for most of the first half but managed to salvage a draw. The following week, McCoist claimed his first competitive victory as manager with a win over St Johnstone. The season proved to be a baptism of fire for McCoist, by early October the club held a ten-point lead over Celtic, and on 5 November the lead stood at fifteen points over Celtic and twelve over second placed Motherwell. However, a draw with St Johnstone and subsequent defeats to Kilmarnock, St Mirren and Old Firm rivals Celtic, who then went on a run of twenty-one matches undefeated saw Rangers slip to second place where the club remained for the rest of the season.

Ranger's European adventure began in the middle of the final week of July, where Rangers were defeated by underdogs Malmö 1–0 at home and Rangers crashed out of the Champions League with a bad tempered 1–1 draw in Sweden in which both Steven Whittaker and Madjid Bougherra were both given their marching orders, and ultimately relegating the Gers to the Europa League play-off round, where they faced Slovenian team NK Maribor. In cup competitions the club fair no better, a third round defeat to First Division side Falkirk in the League Cup and a fifth round exit at home at the hands of Dundee United.

On 13 February 2012, Rangers filed legal papers at the Court of Session giving notice of their intention to appoint administrators. Rangers officially entered administration on the following day, appointing London-based financial advisers Duff & Phelps as administrators. Rangers entered administration over an alleged non-payment of £9m in PAYE and VAT taxes to HM Revenue and Customs. On entering administration, the team was docked ten points by the SPL, a move regarded as 'effectively ending' its 2012 championship challenge. A failure then to submit accounts for 2011 meant the club was not granted a licence to play in European football in season 2012–13. In April it was revealed that the club's total debts could be as high as £134m.

On 13 May it was revealed that Whyte sold his controlling interest in The Rangers Football Club Plc for £2 to a consortium led by Charles Green. Green offered the creditors a settlement, in the form of a company voluntary arrangement (CVA), in an attempt to exit administration. On 12 June 2012, it emerged that HMRC would reject the CVA put forward by Green. Green's takeover of the club depended on the CVA being accepted by HMRC, which would have seen only £8.5m of the total debt repaid. The formal rejection of the CVA, two days later, meant that the Rangers Football Club Plc entered the liquidation process and the clubs corporate owner would have to be transferred to a new company. The oldco's assets, including Rangers F.C., Ibrox Stadium and Rangers Training Centre, were sold to Sevco 5088 Ltd, a consortium led by Green, in a deal worth £5.5m.

Players

Squad information

Transfers

In

Total spending: £4.31m

Out

Total income: £7.513m

New contracts

Squad statistics

Top scorers

Last updated: 13 May 2012
Source: Match reports
Only competitive matches

Disciplinary record

Last updated: 13 May 2012
Source: Match reports
Only competitive matches

Club

Board of directors

Coaching staff

Other staff

Matches

Scottish Premier League

UEFA Champions League

UEFA Europa League

Scottish Cup

League Cup

Friendlies

Competitions

Overall

Scottish Premier League

Standings

Results summary

Results by round

References 

2011-12
Scottish football clubs 2011–12 season
Rangers